Jake Logan (born May 22, 1993) is an American professional wrestler on the independent circuit. He is a former and youngest ever to hold the NWA National Heavyweight Champion.

Professional wrestling career 
Logan was trained by Dory Funk Jr. and then began his career on the independent circuit. Logan wrestles often for the Amarillo based NWA Territory NWA Top of Texas. On September 17, 2016 Logan defeated Greg Anthony to win his first NWA National Heavyweight Championship.

Championships and accomplishments 
National Wrestling Alliance
NWA National Heavyweight Championship (1 time)
NWA Texoma
NWA Texoma Texas Heavyweight Championship (1 time)
NWA Top of Texas
NWA Top of Texas Heavyweight Championship (1 time)
NWA Top of Texas Panhandle Heavyweight Championship (7 times)
NWA Top of Texas Tag Team Championship (3 times)

References

External links

1993 births
Living people
Sportspeople from Amarillo, Texas
American male professional wrestlers
Professional wrestlers from Texas
21st-century professional wrestlers
NWA National Heavyweight Champions